The 1985 UCLA Bruins football team was an American football team that represented the University of California, Los Angeles during the 1985 NCAA Division I-A football season.  In their tenth year under head coach Terry Donahue, the Bruins compiled a 9–2–1 record (6–2 Pac-10), finished in first place in the Pacific-10 Conference, and were ranked #7 in the final AP Poll.  The Bruins went on to defeat #4 Iowa in the 1986 Rose Bowl. Running back Eric Ball was selected as the most valuable player in the 1986 Rose Bowl.

UCLA's offensive leaders in 1985 were quarterback David Norrie with 1,819 passing yards, running back Gaston Green with 712 rushing yards, and wide receiver Karl Dorrell with 565 receiving yards.

Schedule

Personnel

Game summaries

at BYU

at Tennessee

San Diego State

at Washington

Arizona State

at Stanford

at Washington State

California

UCLA moved into first place in the Pac-10 with the win.

at Arizona

Oregon State

at USC

vs. No. 4 Iowa (Rose Bowl)

1986 NFL Draft
The following players were drafted into professional football following the season.

References

UCLA
UCLA Bruins football seasons
Pac-12 Conference football champion seasons
Rose Bowl champion seasons
UCLA Bruins football